Jamshedpur Football Club Reserves and Academy are the reserve side and youth tier setup of Indian Super League side Jamshedpur. Based in Jamshedpur, Jharkhand, the side was founded on 10 March 2018 and  participated in I-League 2nd Division, the second division of Indian football. Jamshedpur also have academy teams of various age groups which operate under the Tata Football Academy and participates in the Elite League.

History
On 20 February 2018, it was announced by the All India Football Federation, the organizing body for Indian football, that Jamshedpur, along with six other Indian Super League sides, would field a reserve team in the I-League 2nd Division, India's second division football league. The reserve side squad and coaches were then unveiled a few weeks later, on 10 March 2018. Hilal Rasool Parray was confirmed as the reserve side's first head coach. It was also stated that the squad would be composed of players from the Tata Football Academy and five players selected from trials who had played in the local football league, the JSA Premier Division.

Statistics and records

Season-by-season

Head Coaches record

See also

 Jamshedpur FC
 Tata Football Academy

References

External links

 

Jamshedpur FC Reserves and Academy
Football clubs in Jamshedpur
Indian reserve football teams
Association football clubs established in 2018
I-League 2nd Division clubs
2018 establishments in Jharkhand
Football academies in India